Courtland Milloy is a columnist and former reporter for The Washington Post. He joined the Post in 1975 after working at the Miami Herald. He is one of the journalists interviewed in the documentary film The Newspaperman. Milloy is known for covering the Washington D.C. area's African American community and highlighting issues in less affluent areas of Washington, D.C. He is a critic of gentrification and urban cyclists. Milloy hosted the BET show For Black Men Only in 1992.

A former critic of Twitter, he later began tweeting. Milloy has been critical of cyclists and has drawn their protests with his columns.

He was a critic of the Washington Redskins team name and has written on issues including panhandling, recovery from drug addiction, reparations, and traffic fines. He was critical of the film Precious.

References

External links

Living people
The Washington Post journalists
Miami Herald people
African-American journalists
BET Networks
Year of birth missing (living people)
21st-century African-American people